Port Alfred School  is a state run, co-educational school located in the coastal town of Port Alfred, Eastern Cape, South Africa.

The Port Alfred School community celebrates its origin at a special Founders Day Assembly in August each year. On this special day,   everyone takes the time to reflect on just how far our town's oldest school has come since those early days of 1883.  This was the year that the school was officially converted into a Government School and it was housed in an Anglican church building in Park Road.  The school then had an enrollment of about fifty boys and girls.

Over the intervening years, the school has grown to nearly 1000 children from creche to Matric situated on a beautiful campus is formerly known as Alexandra Park on the R72.  Rooted in a proud past, the Port Alfred High staff, governing body, and alumni work together to move with the times, catering to the needs of our local children on a multitude of levels.

The school's motto, “Facta Non Verba” meaning “Deeds and not Words” is an underlying yet constant theme which the School underpins at every opportunity.  Honesty, integrity, grit and determination, per- severance, loyalty, and commitment are qualities held in high regard by one and all at Port Alfred High.

Above all, Port Alfred School is a family centered school and this ethos allows for the investment of personal attention in its valued pupils to further their growth and provide an all-round education of an excellent standard.

References

Schools in South Africa